The House and Workshop of master glassmaker Sterner was originally the town house and workshop of the master glassworker Clas Grüner Sterner, "a Viennese craftsman who specialised in stained glass windows". It is located at 6, / in the Brussels municipality of Ixelles, Belgium, not far from the Ixelles Ponds. It is a prime example of Art Nouveau architecture.

History
The building was designed by architect ; construction was started in 1893 and was completed in 1902.

The City of Brussels classified the property as a historic site on 23 October 2003. In a 2015 report, the city's website described the exterior in as follows:Built in brick and white stone, it has two floors and two bays reflecting the functions assigned to the internal spaces: on the left, an entrance door opening onto the vestibule; above, upstairs, small room; on the right, monumental stained-glass window illuminating the stairwell; on the top floor, an artist's studio lit by a sort of trapezoidal bow-window occupying almost the entire width of the facade and highlighted by the cornice. The front door is adorned with stained glass windows whose patterns are in synergy with the circle that encompasses it. This circular architectural motif is also repeated in the upper part of the stained-glass window which illuminates the stairwell.
 
By December 2020, the building's exterior and interior were in the final phases of an extensive renovation that started in 2019. Previously, the facade had become "dangerously degraded". The most apparent modifications include repainting of the turquoise exterior with warmer earth-tones and restoration of the stained glass pieces.

See also

 Art Nouveau in Brussels
 History of Brussels
 Belgium in "the long nineteenth century"

References

Notes

Houses in Belgium
Ixelles
Art Nouveau architecture in Brussels
Art Nouveau houses
Houses completed in 1902